The Llano de Chocolate Beds is a geological unit of sedimentary rock in Atacama Region of Chile. Sediments forming the rock deposited during the Carboniferous and Permian. Lithologies include conglomerate, green sandstone and limestone. It was formerly considered part of the Triassic-aged Canto del Agua Formation.  Llano de Chocolate Beds was deposited in an ancient forearc basin.

References 

Geologic formations of Chile
Carboniferous System of South America
Carboniferous Chile
Pennsylvanian Series
Cisuralian Series
Sakmarian
Permian System of South America
Permian Chile
Conglomerate formations
Sandstone formations
Limestone formations
Carboniferous southern paleotemperate deposits
Permian southern paleotemperate deposits
Geology of Atacama Region